The 2017 Campeonato Nacional season, known as Campeonato Nacional de Transición Scotiabank 2017 for sponsorship purposes, was the 87th season of top-flight football in Chile. Colo-Colo won their thirty-second title following a 3–0 away win at Huachipato on 9 December. Universidad de Chile were the defending champions.

Format changes
Starting in 2017, the ANFP approved a change from the European calendar season (July-May) that had been used since 2013 to a calendar year season (February-December). The year calendar would have been implemented for the 2017 season, however, it was postponed for one year. In order to manage this transition, the 2017 Clausura tournament, part of the 2016–17 season, was followed up by a single championship in the second semester of the year. The 2018 season will be played as a single tournament, without the Apertura-Clausura system.

Teams

Stadia and locations

Personnel and kits

Managerial changes

Standings

Results

Top goalscorers

Source: Soccerway

Runners-up play-off
The runners-up playoff was played between:
Universidad de Concepción (2017 Clausura best team not already qualified for the 2018 Copa Libertadores)
Unión Española (2017 Transición runners-up)

The winner qualified for the 2018 Copa Libertadores second stage, while the loser qualified for the 2018 Copa Sudamericana first stage. In the event that the same team ended up as runners-up of both tournaments, the playoff would not be played and that team would qualify for the Copa Libertadores. The Copa Sudamericana berth would then be awarded to the 2017 Transición best team not already qualified.

Universidad de Concepción won 3–1 on aggregate.

Relegation
Relegation is determined at the end of the season by computing an average of the number of points earned per game over the three most recent tournaments: 2016 Apertura, 2017 Clausura and 2017 Transición. The team with the lowest average qualified for the relegation playoff.

Relegation table

Relegation playoff
The relegation playoff was played by three teams: the last-placed in the relegation table (Santiago Wanderers), 2016–17 Primera B runners-up San Marcos de Arica, and 2017 Primera B champions Unión La Calera. The two Primera B teams played each other with the winner qualifying to the final against the Primera División team for promotion to the top flight for the 2018 season.

Semifinals

Finals

References

External links
ANFP 

2017 in South American football leagues
2017 in Chilean sport
Primera División de Chile seasons